Andrii Doroshenko (born 7 September 1987) is a Ukrainian Paralympic sport shooter. He won the silver medal in the men's 10-metre air rifle standing SH1 event at the 2020 Summer Paralympics held in Tokyo, Japan.

He also represented Ukraine at the 2012 Summer Paralympics held in London, United Kingdom and the 2016 Summer Paralympics held in Rio de Janeiro, Brazil.

References

External links
 

Living people
1987 births
Ukrainian male sport shooters
Shooters at the 2012 Summer Paralympics
Shooters at the 2016 Summer Paralympics
Shooters at the 2020 Summer Paralympics
Medalists at the 2020 Summer Paralympics
Paralympic medalists in shooting
Paralympic silver medalists for Ukraine
Paralympic shooters of Ukraine
Sportspeople from Odesa Oblast
21st-century Ukrainian people